is a women's volleyball team based in Kawasaki, Kanagawa, Japan. It plays in V.League 1. The owner of the team is NEC.

The club was founded in April 1978 as NEC's corporate team, participating the same year in the 10th V.Challenge League tournament. The club advanced to membership in the Japan Volleyball League in 1979, securing 3rd place in the league rankings by the end of the season. The club has subsequently been league champions six times, and marked its 200th victory in 2008.

Honours
Japan Volleyball League/V.League/V.Premier League
Champions (6): 1987–1988, 1996–1997, 1999–2000, 2002–2003, 2004–2005, 2014–2015, 2016–17
Runners-up (4): 1986–1987, 1995–1996, 1997–1998, 2001-2002
Kurowashiki All Japan Volleyball Championship
Champions (2): 1997, 2001
Runners-up (7): 1985, 1987, 1995, 1996, 1999, 2011, 2013

League results

Current squad
2021-2022 Squad, as of 22 June - 2021 

 Head coach:  Takayuki Kaneko

Former players

Domestic players

Hiroko Tsukumo (1993-2004)
Shinako Tanaka (2001-2002)
Yoshie Takeshita (2002-2004)
Megumi Kurihara (2003-2004)
Megumi Kawamura (2001-2005)
Ai Ōtomo (2000-2006)
Miyuki Takahashi (2006-2009)
Ikumi Narita (2007-2010)
Sayoko Matsuzaki (2001-2010)
Saori Arita (2003-2010)
Saori Takasaki (2005-2010)
Ayako Watanabe (2003-2011)
Yuko Maruyama (2008-2011)
Sachiko Sugiyama (1998-2013)
Kanako Naito (2009-2012)
Akari Oumi (2012-2017)
Hiroko Matsuura (2009–2012)
Akiko Ino (2009–2012)
Yumiko Tsuzuki (2013–2014)
Akiko Uchida (2008–2014)
Makoto Matsuura (2010–2014)
Miho Watanabe (2011–2014)
Miyuki Akiyama (2007–2015)
Nami Sagawa (2014–2017)
Kaname Yamaguchi (2014-2019)
Sayaka Iwasaki (2013-2019)
Kana Ono (2011-2019)
Saki Minemura (2018–2020)
Yuna Okuyama (2014–2020)
Shiori Aratani (ja) (2016–2020) Transferred to Himeji Victorina
Mio Sato (2019–2021) (ja) 

Foreign players
 
 Ana Paula Ferreira (2008-2010)
 Fernanda Garay Rodrigues (2010-2011)

 Emiliya Dimitrova (2016-2017)
 
 Hana Čutura (2013–14)
 
 Riikka Lehtonen (2006-2007)

 Berenika Tomsia (2019–2020)
 
 Elena Tyurina (1990-1994)
 Elizaveta Tishchenko (1995-1997)
 Yelena Godina (1998-1999)
 
 Brižitka Molnar (2011-2012)
 
 Yeliz Başa (2012–13, 2014–2016)
 Neriman Özsoy (2020–2021)
 
 Erin Aldrich (2007-2008)
 Rhamat Alhassan (2018–19)

References

Japanese volleyball teams
Volleyball clubs established in 1978
1978 establishments in Japan
Sport in Kawasaki, Kanagawa
NEC Corporation